Germán Federico Alecha (born 29 July 1985) is an Argentine association football forward.

He played for Unión San Felipe.

References
 Profile at BDFA 
 

1985 births
Living people
Argentine expatriate footballers
Argentine footballers
Huracán de Tres Arroyos footballers
San Martín de Mendoza footballers
Villa Mitre footballers
Unión San Felipe footballers
Expatriate footballers in Chile
Association football forwards
Footballers from La Plata